Debra Silverstein is the Alderman of the 50th Ward of the City of Chicago, Illinois.  She defeated 38-year incumbent Bernard Stone in the 2011 runoff election, a race in which she was endorsed by Mayor-elect Rahm Emanuel.  As of 2019–2020, she is also the Democratic Party's committeeperson for the 50th Ward.

Biography 
Silverstein is married to former Illinois State Senator Ira Silverstein, with whom she has four children. She holds a degree in accounting from the University of Illinois at Chicago. Before entering politics, she founded a small tax consultancy.

In addition to her political work, Silverstein is a co-founder of the Libenu Foundation, an organization creating supervised housing for adults with developmental disabilities in the Metropolitan Chicago area.

Silverstein attempted to sell the cities old Northtown library building in a private deal with an organization at half price and lease part of the property to Libenu, the organization she cofounded. The neighborhood was notified months later, and proceeded to alert the city, where she was then forced to follow the correct legal channels of publicly putting the property up, resulting in the building being sold to the highest bidder at more than double the cost she offered the private entity.

Aldermanic career 

In 2022, Silverstein was accused of intentionally altering the ward map to remove her opposition including Halle Quezada who unsuccessfully ran against Silverstein for the wards Democratic Committeeperson in 2020, and Mueze Bawany who is running against Silverstein for 50th ward Alderman in the 2023 election.

In conjunction with the Chicago Department of Transportation, Silverstein oversaw the Devon Avenue Streetscape Project, a $15 million project on Devon Avenue in the 50th Ward. The project was designed to modernize and beautify a "20-block stretch in the West Ridge Business District which is known for ethnically diverse mixture of shops and restaurants." The project covered Devon from Kedzie Avenue to Leavitt Street.

 New trees with tree grates
 Landscaped in-ground and above-ground planters
 Light pole, intersection, and gateway community identifiers
 New crosswalks at each intersection

The project highlights included:
 New wider sidewalks with ADA ramps
 New curbs and gutters
 New street and pedestrian lighting
 Paver parkways
 Benches, bike racks and waste containers
 Seating areas on side streets
 New trees with tree grates
 Landscaped in-ground and above-ground planters
 Light pole, intersection, and gateway community identifiers
 New crosswalks at each intersection

In 2016, Silverstein and Mayor Rahm Emanuel announced plans for a new library and senior housing facility in the 50th Ward. A partnership between Chicago Public Library and Chicago Housing Authority, Northtown Apartments and the new Northtown Branch Library are located at 6800 N. Western Avenue. The project was designed by Perkins + Will and to feature 44 apartments designated for senior use on top of a 16,000 square foot library.  The library was scheduled to be open in December 2018, but actually opened on March 5, 2019, while apartment construction continued.

Footnotes

1966 births
21st-century American politicians
21st-century American women politicians
Chicago City Council members
Living people
Women city councillors in Illinois